Bibelot may refer to:

 The Bibelot, a yearly literary anthology 1895–1914, and The Bibelots, a series of 29 midget reprints of English classics
 Bibelot Mansur (born 1978}, a Mexican actress